The 2013 San Luis Open Challenger was a professional tennis tournament played on clay courts. It was the 20th edition of the tournament which was part of the 2013 ATP Challenger Tour. It took place in San Luis Potosí, Mexico between 25 and 31 March 2013.

Singles main draw entrants

Seeds

 1 Rankings are as of March 18, 2013.

Other entrants
The following players received wildcards into the singles main draw:
  Miguel Gallardo Valles
  Daniel Garza
  Nicolás Massú
  Manuel Sánchez

The following players received entry as an alternate into the singles main draw:
  Adrián Menéndez Maceiras

The following players received entry from the qualifying draw:
  Marcelo Arévalo
  Alessio di Mauro
  Christopher Díaz Figueroa
  Ruben Gonzales

Doubles main draw entrants

Seeds

1 Rankings as of March 18, 2013.

Other entrants
The following pairs received wildcards into the doubles main draw:
  Miguel Gallardo Valles /  Nicolás Massú
  Daniel Garza /  Miguel Ángel Reyes-Varela
  Riccardo Ghedin /  Manuel Sánchez

Champions

Singles

 Alessio di Mauro def.  Daniel Kosakowski, 4–6, 6–3, 6–2

Doubles

 Marin Draganja /  Adrián Menéndez Maceiras def.  Marco Chiudinelli /  Peter Gojowczyk, 6–4, 6–3

External links
Official website

San Luis Open Challenger
San Luis Potosí Challenger